Rear Admiral Jacob Andries Cornelius 'Jaap' Weideman (1936 - 1996) was a South African Navy officer.

He joined the Navy in 1954 and in 1955 attended the South African Military Academy.

In 1968 he commanded .

In 1982 he was appointed as Inspector General (Navy).

Awards and decorations

See also
List of South African military chiefs

References

South African admirals
1936 births
1996 deaths
Submarine commanders